Michael Lalremkima (born 15 February 1986) is an Indian cricketer. He made his List A debut for Mizoram in the 2018–19 Vijay Hazare Trophy on 19 September 2018. He made his first-class debut for Mizoram in the 2018–19 Ranji Trophy on 1 November 2018. He shared the captaincy  role for  Mizoram, with the designated captain S Zorinliana, for the 2018–19 Ranji Trophy.

References

External links
 

1986 births
Living people
Indian cricketers
Mizoram cricketers
Place of birth missing (living people)